Bodegas Alejandro Fernández is a Spanish wine company consisting of four wineries (bodegas). Alejandro Fernandez first founded  Pesquera Bodega in Ribera del Duero in 1972. Ribera del Duero was listed at denominación de origen status in 1982 largely as a result of his efforts to practice quality winemaking in the region, which was traditionally planted to sugarbeet  and grain.

The vines are planted to low espalier trellises to absorb more heat from the ground, and grow in poor, well-drained soils composed of sand and gravel above a limestone and clay subsoil.

References

Wineries of Spain
Spanish companies established in 1972
Food and drink companies established in 1972